is a passenger railway station located in Mihama Ward, Chiba City, Chiba Prefecture, Japan, operated by the East Japan Railway Company (JR East).

Lines
Kemigawahama Station is served by the Keiyō Line and is 33.7 kilometers from the western terminus of the line  at Tokyo Station.

Station layout
The station consists of two elevated side platforms serving two tracks, with the station building located underneath. The station is staffed.

Platforms

History
The station opened on 3 March 1986. The station was absorbed into the JR East network upon the privatization of JNR on April 1, 1987. 

Station numbering was introduced to in 2016 with Kemigawahama being assigned station number JE14.

Passenger statistics
In fiscal 2019, the station was used by an average of 15,635 passengers daily

Surrounding area
 Mihama ward office
 Mihama post office
 Chiba Prefectural Kemigawa High school
 Tokyo Dental College Chiba campus
 Chiba Kaihin Municipal Hospital

See also
 List of railway stations in Japan

References

External links

JR East Kemigawahama Station 

Railway stations in Japan opened in 1986
Keiyō Line
Railway stations in Chiba (city)